Gerrit Schulte (7 January 1916 – 26 February 1992) was a Dutch professional track bicycle racer. Between 1940 and 1960 he won 19 six-day races out of 73 starts and was one of the dominant Six days racers of his time. Schulte was as well successful in track pursuit, becoming national champion ten times, European champion twice and world champion once, in 1948, when he beat Fausto Coppi in the final. He was also successful as a road race cyclists, becoming national champion three times and winning a stage in the 1938 Tour de France.  Since 1955, the Gerrit Schulte Trophy has been awarded by the national federation to the best professional rider in the Netherlands.

Biography

Amateur career
Schulte competed at the 1936 Summer Olympics in the individual and team road races, but did not finish. Next year he turned professional.

1938 Tour de France
In the 1938 Tour de France, Schulte joined as a member of the Dutch team. He won the third stage, and abandoned the race in the eighth stage. After that, he went to Paris, and won 10.000 francs in a criterium. His team mate Theo Middelkamp did finish the 1938 Tour, and also won a stage, but Middelkamp only won 8.000 francs during the Tour. They both decided to never return to the Tour, because in other races they could win more money.

Later life
Since 1955, every year the Gerrit Schulte Trophy is awarded by the national federation to the best professional rider in the Netherlands, and Schulte himself has won it once in 1958. After retiring from competitions he worked as a cycling coach and managed the restaurant in De Vliert, the football stadium of his home town Den Bosch.

Major results

1937
Dussen
Ronde van Gouda, Amateurs
Hoogerheide
1938
Antwerpen
Purmerend
Oss
Vinkeveen
Eindhoven
Tour de France:
Winner stage 3
1939
Acht van Chaam
Antwerpen
Zaandam
Baarle-Hertog
Namur
1940
 national track pursuit championship
Six days of Antwerp (with Gerrit Boeyen)
Gent
1941
 national track pursuit championship
1942
 national track pursuit championship
Roermond
Hilversum
1943
 national track pursuit championship
Roermond
1944
 national track pursuit championship
Ronde van Gouda
 Dutch National Road Race Championship
1945
 national track pursuit championship
Beverwijk
1946
Six days of Paris (with Gerrit Boeyen)
Tongeren
Hoensbroek
1947
Six days of Ghent (with Gerrit Boeyen)
GP Stad Sint-Niklaas
 national track pursuit championship
Six days of Brussels (with Gerrit Boeyen)
1948
Brasschaat
Den Bosch
 national track pursuit championship
Oss
 World Champion Track Pursuit
 Dutch National Road Race Championship
1949
European Championship Track Madison (with Gerrit Boeyen)
Ronde van Nederland
Roosendaal
Temse
Six days of Ghent (with Gerrit Boeyen)
Six days of Antwerp (with Gerrit Boeyen)
Zwijndrecht
Willebroek
Den Bosch
1950
Antwerpen
Boucles de la Gartempe
European Championship Track Madison (with Gerard Peters)
Six days of Ghent (with Gerard Peters)
 national track pursuit championship
 Dutch National Road Race Championship
Six days of Paris (with Gerard Peters)
Etten-Leur
1951
 national track pursuit championship
Westerlo
1952
Sas van Gent, Sas van Gent
1953
Six days of Paris (with Gerard Peters)
 Dutch National Road Race Championship
Den Bosch
1954
Six days of Berlin (with Gerard Peters, Emile Carrara and Dominique Forlini)
Six days of Antwerp (with Gerard Peters)
Goes, Goes
1955
Six days of Münster (with Gerard Peters)
Den Bosch
Helmond
1956
Den Bosch
Dussum
Helmond
Six days of Zürich (with Kay Werner Nielsen)
Leuven
Six days of Copenhagen (with Lucien Gillen)
1957
Six days of Zürich (with Armin von Büren)
1958
Six days of Berlin (with Klaus Bugdahl)
Den Bosch
Wevelgem
Hanret
1959
Six days of Antwerpen (with Klaus Bugdahl and Peter Post)
Six days of Brussel (with Peter Post)
1960
Six days of Antwerpen (with Jan Plantaz and Peter Post)

See also
 List of Dutch Olympic cyclists

References

External links 

Official Tour de France results for Gerrit Schulte

1916 births
1992 deaths
Dutch Tour de France stage winners
UCI Track Cycling World Champions (men)
Cyclists from Amsterdam
Olympic cyclists of the Netherlands
Cyclists at the 1936 Summer Olympics
UCI Road World Championships cyclists for the Netherlands
Dutch track cyclists
20th-century Dutch people